Katie Cherie Duncan (1 February 1988) is a New Zealand footballer who plays as a defensive midfielder for Onehunga Sports and the New Zealand national team.

Club career
Duncan signed for the Melbourne Victory ahead of the 2013–14 season.

In January 2014, Duncan agreed to join English side Notts County after the Australian season had concluded.

International career
Duncan represented New Zealand at age group level, appearing at the 2006 Women's U-20 World Cup finals, and again represented the young Ferns at the 2008 Women's U-20 World Cup in Chile. before making her full Football Ferns debut in a 0–3 loss to China on 14 November 2006, and represented New Zealand at the 2007 FIFA Women's World Cup finals in China, where they lost to Brazil 0–5, Denmark (0–2) and China (0–2).

Duncan was also included in the New Zealand squad for the 2008 Summer Olympics where they drew with Japan (2–2) before losing to Norway(0–1) and Brazil (0–4).

She scored her first senior international goal in a 10–0 win over Cook Islands at the Oceania Women's Nations Cup on 1 October 2010.

Duncan played for New Zealand at the 2011 FIFA Women's World Cup where she earned her 50th cap in a 2–1 loss to England in the group stages.

She was part of New Zealand's 2012 Olympic squad and 2016 Olympic Squad. She also featured in all New Zealand's three matches at the 2015 FIFA Women's World Cup in Canada. On October 11, 2019, Duncan announced her retirement from international soccer.

Personal life
Duncan is married to fellow New Zealand footballer Priscilla Duncan, with Priscilla expecting their first baby in July 2019. She has a Bachelor of Physical Education from the University of Auckland.

Honours
Individual
 IFFHS OFC Woman Team of the Decade 2011–2020

References

External links
 
 Profile at NZF
 

1988 births
Living people
Association footballers from Auckland
Expatriate women's footballers in England
Expatriate women's footballers in Germany
Expatriate women's footballers in Switzerland
Expatriate women's soccer players in Australia
Expatriate women's soccer players in the United States
FC Zürich Frauen players
FIFA Century Club
Footballers at the 2008 Summer Olympics
Footballers at the 2012 Summer Olympics
Footballers at the 2016 Summer Olympics
Melbourne Victory FC (A-League Women) players
Swiss Women's Super League players
New Zealand expatriate women's association footballers
New Zealand expatriate sportspeople in Australia
New Zealand expatriate sportspeople in the United States
New Zealand expatriate sportspeople in Germany
New Zealand expatriate sportspeople in England
New Zealand expatriate sportspeople in Switzerland
New Zealand women's association footballers
New Zealand women's international footballers
Notts County L.F.C. players
Olympic association footballers of New Zealand
SC 07 Bad Neuenahr players
Sportspeople from Cambridge, New Zealand
Women's association football midfielders
2007 FIFA Women's World Cup players
2011 FIFA Women's World Cup players
2015 FIFA Women's World Cup players
2019 FIFA Women's World Cup players
University of Auckland alumni

New Zealand LGBT sportspeople
LGBT association football players
Lesbian sportswomen